Preston Terrance Williams (born March 27, 1997)  is an American football wide receiver for the Carolina Panthers of the National Football League (NFL). He played college football at Colorado State.

Early years
Williams attended Lovejoy High School in Lovejoy, Georgia. He committed to the University of Tennessee to play college football.

College career
Williams played at Tennessee for two seasons from 2015 to 2016. He recorded 16 receptions for 247 yards and two touchdowns over that time. He transferred to Colorado State University in 2017. After sitting out the 2017 season due to NCAA transfer rules, Williams had 96 receptions for 1,345 yards and 14 touchdowns in 2018. He led the Mountain West Conference in receptions and receiving yards and finished second in receiving touchdowns. After the 2018 season, he entered the 2019 NFL Draft, forgoing his senior season.

Professional career

Miami Dolphins

2019
Williams signed with the Miami Dolphins as an undrafted free agent on May 9, 2019. He made the final 53-man roster. He made his NFL debut in the Dolphins' 2019 season opener against the Baltimore Ravens. In the 59–10 loss, he had three receptions for 24 yards and his first professional touchdown. In Week 9, Williams had five catches for 72 yards and two touchdowns in the 26–18 win over the New York Jets. However in the game, Williams left the game with a knee injury, and was diagnosed with a torn ACL, ending his rookie season. He finished the season with 32 catches for 428 yards and three touchdowns as the team's leading receiver at the time of his injury.

2020
In Week 5 against the San Francisco 49ers, Williams recorded four catches for 108 yards and a 32-yard touchdown reception during the 43–17 win. On November 11, 2020, Williams was placed on injured reserve with a foot injury.

2022
On March 15, 2022, Williams signed a one-year contract extension with the Dolphins. He was waived on August 30, 2022.

Carolina Panthers
On September 5, 2022, Williams signed with the practice squad of the Carolina Panthers. He was signed to the active roster on January 7, 2023.

References

External links
Carolina Panthers bio
Colorado State Rams bio

1997 births
Living people
People from Clayton County, Georgia
Sportspeople from the Atlanta metropolitan area
Players of American football from Georgia (U.S. state)
American football wide receivers
Tennessee Volunteers football players
Colorado State Rams football players
Miami Dolphins players
Carolina Panthers players
Track and field athletes from Georgia (U.S. state)
Colorado State Rams men's track and field athletes